The Albert and Minna Ten Eyck Round Barn is located in Spring Grove, Wisconsin.

History
Albert M. Ten Eyck was a noted agricultural academic and President of the American Society of Agronomy. He and his wife, Minna, took over his family's farm in 1918. The barn was added to the State Register of Historic Places in 2015 and to the National Register of Historic Places the following year.

References

Barns on the National Register of Historic Places in Wisconsin
National Register of Historic Places in Green County, Wisconsin
Round barns in Wisconsin
Buildings and structures completed in 1922